Jared Casey is a fictional character from the NBC/DirecTV soap opera, Passions, portrayed by James Stevenson from July 21, 2006 to July 23, 2007.

Storylines

Little is known about Jared's past. It is believed he spent a portion of his childhood in Mexico, near where Paloma Lopez-Fitzgerald grew up; he has mentioned living in various other locations around the world, including in Chicago, where he says he had an early job as a janitor, as well as doing business in Hawaii and living in France.

Most notably, Jared's past includes a tragic love story; on one of their first dates, he told Theresa Crane that, years ago, he'd loved and lost a woman named Arabella, whom he'd met on holiday in Provence and lived with in Paris. When Theresa volunteered the Crane resources to help him find Arabella, he claimed that Arabella had died, and we have since learned that he was part of a love triangle with her, with Jared strongly implying Arabella wasn't, in some sense, free to love him.

Jared apparently came to Harmony to interview for the position as Head Legal Counsel at Crane Industries, a position which Theresa had originally earmarked for her long-time flame Ethan Winthrop and which the well-qualified Jared (who possesses an M.B.A. as well as a law degree) was promptly offered, but not without some early confusion on his part regarding Theresa's identity.

When Theresa and Jared first met, he had no idea she was CEO of the organization he'd come to work for; he knew her only as a rude woman who spilled her beverage on him at Harmony's Blue Note Night Club, where the pair first verbally sparred, and later danced as part of Theresa's effort to irritate her rival, Gwen Winthrop, by making Gwen's husband, Ethan, jealous.

In their early relationship, Jared believed Theresa to be a struggling single mother (rather than CEO of a multibillion-dollar corporation) and Theresa believed Jared to be a rude male chauvinist, a belief which culminated in her challenging him to a male vs. female baseball game. It was at that game that Harmony's resident witch, Tabitha Lenox, remarked that she knew Jared's "real story" and would like a "front row seat" when it came out.

Jared and Theresa's relationship was strained by Ethan's jealousy in late 2006. Ethan accused Jared of hiding secrets and using Theresa for her money. He investigated Jared, hacked into his laptop, attempted to make a deal with a reporter, and gave Jared a lie detector test. Despite passing the test, Jared was left with the implication he was lying or hiding something. Meanwhile, Theresa and Ethan were secretly having an affair which Jared found out about in late January 2007 after finding them in bed together.

Jared was convinced by Valerie Davis to fight for Theresa and protect her. He discovered Theresa was being blackmailed and helped her recover the evidence, even though it meant "making a deal with the devil." He was shot while trying to recover the evidence. Theresa later resumed her engagement with Jared and they married in April 2007 while Jared was still recovering from his gunshot wound. However, Jared was unaware that Theresa was being blackmailed into the relationship and that her blackmailer demanded she have a child with him. He also did not know about her ongoing relationship with Ethan. It remains unclear if Jared has any secrets of his own. On July 23, 2007, Jared left Harmony and did not return.

Source links
soapcentral.com|PS Online
Jared at Soap Central

External links
Who's Who at soapcentral.com

Passions characters
Fictional lawyers
Television characters introduced in 2006
Male characters in television